The Milwaukee Panthers are an NCAA Division I college baseball team competing in the Horizon League for the University of Wisconsin–Milwaukee. The current head coach is Scott Doffek.

As the only Division I college baseball team in the state of Wisconsin, the Panthers have seen much success, including posting six 30-win seasons in the last nine years. They have also qualified for three NCAA Tournaments since 1999, including a win over #1 ranked Rice in the first round of the 1999 NCAA Tournament. In 2008 the Panthers were the number five seed in the conference tournament and made the finals only to lose 16–3 to number one UIC. The 2010 team saw them reach the NCAA tournament for the first time since 2002, only to lose to number one Arizona State and then to San Diego in the elimination bracket.

Coaches

NCAA tournament results
The Panthers have appeared in four NCAA Tournaments. Their combined record is 1–8.

Facilities
After playing at a variety of home sites in 1991, the Panthers played at Simmons Field in Kenosha in 1992 and 1993. They then began playing home games at Henry Aaron Field at Lincoln Park in Glendale for the 1994 season. The 2019 Panthers schedule showed home games played at Henry Aaron Field; at Kapco Park on the campus of Concordia University Wisconsin; and one game at Miller Park.

In February 2018, the Panthers reached an agreement to move their home games to Franklin Field in Franklin, Wisconsin. Their first game in Franklin was scheduled for March 20, 2020, but before that date all remaining games were canceled due to the COVID-19 pandemic.  They wouldn't host a game a Franklin Field until March 26, 2021, a 6–3 win over Purdue Fort Wayne.

All-Americans
Mike Goetz, 2006

Major League Baseball
Milwaukee has had 21 Major League Baseball Draft selections since the draft began in 1965.

See also
List of NCAA Division I baseball programs

References

 
Baseball teams established in 1957
1957 establishments in Wisconsin